Nautrēni Parish is an administrative unit of Rēzekne Municipality, Latvia.

Towns, villages and settlements of Nautrēni parish 
The central village in the parish is Rogovka.

References 

Parishes of Latvia
Rēzekne Municipality